Attenborites janeae is a species of Ediacaran organism from South Australia first described by a team led by Palaeontologist Mary L. Droser in 2018. The genus Attenborites was named after Sir David Attenborough. The bed in which the first 52 specimens from Australia of A. janeae was given the ARB designation "Alice's Restaurant Bed", and has been given that nickname for its abundance of rare taxa and newly described ones and is also a reference to Arlo Guthrie's 1967 song, "Alice's Restaurant". The new taxon is unique from all of these other taxa in the way that it has a much more irregular morphology than the other 52 specimens.

The bed
A team of palaeontologists from the University of California led by Mary L. Droser excavated the fossiliferous bed that Attenborites was described from in 2018. The bed contained a number of unique taxa that also appear in the White Sea of Russia, such as Andiva and Parvancorina. However, common fossils from Nilpena such as Aspidella and Funisia are noticeably absent or are only represented by one specimen.

This bed gives more insight into being able to evaluate communities of the South Australian Ediacaran Biota under unique and exceptional preservational conditions, and to assess the potential extent to discover the taphonomic bias on the much coarser-grained fossiliferous beds at Nilpena. The fact that the bed contains a number of unique taxa also includes the opportunity to study another abundant fossil, Andiva, in the way that Palaeontologists can examine its growth and life from a single community of Ediacarans.

Importance and interpretation
Attenborites is unique from all of these other taxa in the way that it has a much more irregular morphology and the inner-outer morphology of the 52 specimens. Although there is no direct evidence of A. janeae as living is a Pelagic environment, it should be taken note of as the preservational method suggests that a Pelagic lifestyle should at least be considered.

Description

A. janeae represents a roughly oval-shaped form preserved in Negative Hyporelief that possess a number of internally preserved grooves and ridges (variable in number) that run parallel to the long axis which typically converges towards the end of its body. The length of each specimens ranges from 4.2–24 mm (0.165354-0.944882 inches).

In real life, Attenborites would have looked much smoother than its fossils suggest, and would look like ellipsoidal forms possessing a relatively smooth surface, with the ridges found in fossil specimens being concluded that they were actually the result of taphonomic features being formed during deflation rather than them being actual anatomical and morphological features. 

Attenborites has also been described more informally as being "adorned with internal grooves and ridges, that gives it a superficial raisin-like appearance".

Etymology
The bed was given the ARB designation for "Alice's Restaurant Bed", with the designation being a reference to Arlo Guthrie's song, "Alice's Restaurant Massacree", specifically a reference to the line "You can get anything you want at Alice's restaurant".

Mary L. Droser named the genus Attenborites after the English environmentalist Sir David Attenborough.

See also
 List of Ediacaran genera

References

Ediacaran
Ediacaran life
Enigmatic prehistoric animal genera
Aquatic animals
Fossil taxa described in 2018